Potato Research: Journal of the European Association for Potato Research is a quarterly peer-reviewed scientific journal covering all aspects of the production and use of potatoes. It was established in 1958 as the European Potato Journal, obtaining its current name in 1970. It is published by Springer Science+Business Media on behalf of the European Association for Potato Research. The editor-in-chief is Paul C. Struik (Wageningen University).

Abstracting and indexing
The journal is abstracted and indexed in:

According to the Journal Citation Reports, the journal has a 2017 impact factor of 0.771.

References

External links

European Association for Potato Research

Agricultural journals
Potatoes
Publications established in 1958
English-language journals
Quarterly journals
Springer Science+Business Media academic journals